Saint-Sulpice-les-Feuilles is a commune in the Haute-Vienne department in the Nouvelle-Aquitaine region in west-central France.

Geography
The Benaize flows through the commune and forms part of its south-eastern and western borders.

See also
Communes of the Haute-Vienne department

References

Communes of Haute-Vienne